Rowena is a figure in Geoffrey of Monmouth's Historia Regum Britanniae, the daughter of the Saxon king Hengest and wife of Vortigern.

Rowena can also refer to:

Places
in the United States
 Rowena, Georgia, an unincorporated community
 Rowena, Kentucky, an unincorporated community
 Rowena, Minnesota, an unincorporated community
 Rowena, Missouri, an unincorporated community
 Rowena, Oregon, an unincorporated community
 Rowena, South Dakota, an unincorporated community
 Rowena, Texas, an unincorporated community

in Australia
 Rowena, New South Wales, a town

People
Rowena Fulham (born 1960), former footballer who represented New Zealand at the international level
Rowena Guanzon, Filipino lawyer and public servant
Rowena Hume (1877-1966), Canadian obstetrician
Rowena Jackson (born 1926), New Zealand prima ballerina
Rowena King (born 1970), British actress
Rowena Meeks Abdy (1887–1945), American painter in Northern California
Rowena Moore (1910–1998), union and civic activist
Rowena Morrill (1944–2021), science-fiction and fantasy illustrator and painter
Rowena Sánchez Arrieta, a Filipina pianist, born in 1962
Rowena Spencer (born 1922), American physician
Rowena Granice Steele (1824–1901), American performer, journalist, publisher
Rowena Wallace, Australian actress, known for her role as Patricia in Sons and Daughters

Fictional characters
 The Lady Rowena, Ivanhoe's love interest in the novel of the same name by Walter Scott
 Rowena Ravenclaw, one of the founders of Hogwarts in the Harry Potter series of books
 Rowena Morgan, a singer in the movie Mr. Holland's Opus
 Rowena MacLeod, a 300+ year old Scottish witch in the American television series Supernatural

Other
 Rowena (horse), a British Thoroughbred racehorse